Front may refer to:

Arts, entertainment, and media

Films 
 The Front (1943 film), a 1943 Soviet drama film
 The Front, 1976 film

Music
The Front (band), an American rock band signed to Columbia Records and active in the 1980s and early 1990s
The Front (Canadian band), a Canadian studio band from the 1980s

Periodicals
 Front (magazine), a British men's magazine
 Front Illustrated Paper, a publication of the Yugoslav People's Army

Television
 Front TV, a Toronto broadcast design and branding firm
 "The Front" (The Blacklist), a 2014 episode of the TV series The Blacklist
 "The Front" (The Simpsons), a 1993 episode of the TV series The Simpsons

Military
 Front (military), a geographical area where armies are engaged in conflict
 Front (military formation), roughly, an army group, especially in eastern Europe

Places
 Front, California, former name of Brown, California
 Front, Piedmont, an Italian municipality
 The Front, now part of the Delaware Park-Front Park System, in Buffalo, New York, US

Science and technology
 Front (oceanography), a place where two water masses come together in the ocean
 Front (physics), a solution connecting two steady states
 Front (sociology), or mask, in dramaturgy
 Front and back, descriptors of phonemes in linguistics
 Front vowel, a class of vowel sounds, in linguistics
 Ice front of a glacier
 Weather front, a boundary separating air masses, and the cause of most weather phenomena

Other uses
 Front organization,  any entity set up by and controlled by another organization
 Rebecca Front (born 1964), English comedy actress
 Grill (jewelry), also known as "front", jewelry for teeth

See also
 
 
 
 
 Front end (disambiguation)
 Fronting (disambiguation)
 National Front (disambiguation)
 Full Frontal (disambiguation)